Fairlee is the primary village and a census-designated place (CDP) in the town of Fairlee, Orange County, Vermont, United States. As of the 2020 census, it had a population of 198  out of 988 in the entire town of Fairlee.

The CDP is on the eastern edge Orange County, in the southeast part of the town of Fairlee. It is bordered to the east by the Connecticut River, which forms the Vermont–New Hampshire border. The town of Orford, New Hampshire, is to the east across the river. U.S. Route 5 passes through the center of the village, and Interstate 91 runs along the western edge. Both highways lead north  to Bradford and south the same distance to Thetford. Vermont Route 25A leads east  to the Samuel Morey Memorial Bridge across the Connecticut River, at which point it becomes New Hampshire Route 25A, leading into Orford.

References 

Populated places in Orange County, Vermont
Census-designated places in Orange County, Vermont
Census-designated places in Vermont